Ewa Nikola Swoboda (born 26 July 1997) is a Polish track and field sprinter who specialises in the short sprints. She is a three-time European Indoor Championships medallist in the 60 metres, having won the gold medal in 2019 and silvers in 2017 and 2023

The 17-year-old was a finalist in the 60 m in her senior debut at the 2015 European Indoor Championships. Still 17, she became the 2015 European junior champion over the 100 metres to take the silver medal at the 2016 World Junior Championships. She twice won the event at the European U23 Championships (2017, 2019). Swoboda holds the world junior record of 7.07 seconds and the Polish record of 6.99 seconds in the 60 metres. She is a multiple medallist of national outdoor and indoor championships.

Career
Ewa Swoboda started competing in athletics from a young age and after joining the UKS Czwórka Żory athletics club she began training under her coach Iwona Krupa. She won the Polish youth titles in the 100 metres in 2011 and 2012. The following year she won the national indoor junior 200 metres race. Her international debut came at the 2013 World Youth Championships in Athletics and she placed fourth in the girls' 100 m with a run of 11.61 seconds; she was the best European in the race. After this she ran a personal best and Polish junior record of 11.54 seconds in the 100 m at the Polish Youth Olympic Days, where she completed a sprint double.

At the start of 2014 she claimed the Polish indoor junior title in the 60 metres. Outdoors, at the 2014 World Junior Championships in Athletics she was fifth in the 100 m, and failed to finish in the 200 m. At the European Youth Olympic Trials in Baku she won the 100 m and was runner-up in the 200 m. This made her one of the favourites for the 2014 Youth Olympics, and she ran a new best of 11.30 seconds in her opening race – making her the seconds fastest junior athlete that year. However, her success was short-lived in that event as she was disqualified in the 100 m final for a false start in the midst of crowd noise.

Swoboda won her first senior national title at the 2015 Polish Indoor Championships and she also set a 60 metres European junior record of 7.21 seconds during the competition, which was also a world best for a seventeen-year-old. This gained her selection for the 2015 European Athletics Indoor Championships – her first senior appearance for Poland. Still aged seventeen, she made the final of the 60 m and ran another personal best of 7.20 seconds, improving her European junior record by 0.01 seconds. This was the joint fastest time achieved by a Polish woman in the competition's history – matching that of Irena Szewińska and Daria Korczyńska (both of whom were medallists).

In March 2018 it was announced that Swoboda would be upgraded to silver medalist at the 2017 European Indoor Championship, after Ukraine's Olesya Povh's was disqualified for the use of unauthorized substances.

She was unable to participate at the 2021 European Athletics Indoor Championships in Toruń after testing positive to COVID-19 shortly before the start of the championships. Swoboda also did not compete at the 2020 Tokyo Olympics due to injury.

On 11 February 2022, she broke the Polish national record in the 60 meters twice at the Orlen Cup meeting in Łódź and set a new one by achieving 7.00 seconds. On 5 March, she broke the record again at the Polish Indoor Championships in Toruń with a time of 6.99 seconds, which was the tenth best result in the history of the competition.

She placed fourth at the 2022 World Indoor Championships held in Belgrade in a time of 7.04 seconds. The same time was measured for the fifth and sixth woman while Swoboda lost the bronze medal by 0.002 s.

Achievements

Personal bests
 100 metres – 11.07 (+0.7 m/s ISTAF Berlin 2019) 
 100 metres U20 – 11.12 (+0.9 m/s Bydgoszcz 2016) 
 100 metres U18 – 11.30 (0.0 m/s Nanjing 2014) 
 200 metres – 23.79 (+0.3 m/s) (Linz 2018)
Indoor
 60 metres – 6.99 (Toruń 2022) 
 60 metres U20 – 7.07 (Toruń 2016) 
 200 metres – 24.55 (Spała 2014)

International competitions

National titles
 Polish Athletics Championships
 100 metres (6): 2016, 2017, 2018, 2019, 2020, 2022
 4 × 100 m relay (1): 2020
 Polish Indoor Athletics Championships
 60 metres (7): 2015, 2017, 2018, 2019, 2021, 2022, 2023

References

External links

European Athletics profile

Living people
1997 births
Polish female sprinters
Athletes (track and field) at the 2014 Summer Youth Olympics
People from Żory
Athletes (track and field) at the 2016 Summer Olympics
Olympic athletes of Poland
Polish Athletics Championships winners
European Athletics Indoor Championships winners
Olympic female sprinters
20th-century Polish women
21st-century Polish women
European Athletics Championships medalists